The renal calyces are chambers of the kidney through which urine passes. The minor calyces surround the apex of the renal pyramids. Urine formed in the kidney passes through a renal papilla at the apex into the minor calyx; two or three minor calyces converge to form a major calyx, through which urine passes before continuing through the renal pelvis into the ureter.

Function
Peristalsis of the smooth muscle originating in pace-maker cells originating in the walls of the calyces propels urine through the renal pelvis and ureters to the bladder. The initiation is caused by the increase in volume that stretches the walls of the calyces. This causes them to fire impulses which stimulate rhythmical contraction and relaxation, called peristalsis. Parasympathetic innervation enhances the peristalsis while sympathetic innervation inhibits it.

Clinical significance

A "staghorn calculus" is a kidney stone that may extend into the renal calyces.

A renal diverticulum is diverticulum of renal calyces.

See also
 Renal medulla
 Renal pyramids

References

External links
  - "Posterior Abdominal Wall: Internal Structure of a Kidney"
  - "Posterior Abdominal Wall: Internal Structure of a Kidney"
  - "Urinary System: neonatal kidney"
 
 Diagram at bway.net

Kidney anatomy